The 1966 Oklahoma State Cowboys baseball team represented Oklahoma State University–Stillwater in the 1966 NCAA University Division baseball season. The Cowboys played their home games at Allie P. Reynolds Stadium in Stillwater, Oklahoma. The team was coached by Chet Bryan in his second season at Oklahoma State.

The Cowboys reached the College World Series, finishing as the runner up to Ohio State.

Roster

Schedule

References 

Oklahoma State
Oklahoma State Cowboys baseball seasons
College World Series seasons
Big Eight Conference baseball champion seasons